Jannes Luca Wieckhoff (born 2 August 2000) is a German professional footballer who plays as a right-back for  club FC St. Pauli.

Career
Wieckhoff made his debut for FC St. Pauli in the first round of the 2020–21 DFB-Pokal on 13 September 2020, coming on as a substitute in the 36th minute for Marvin Senger against fourth-division side SV Elversberg, which finished as a 4–2 away loss. He made his 2. Bundesliga debut the following week on 21 September, starting in the away match against VfL Bochum.

References

External links
 
 
 

2000 births
Living people
People from Pinneberg
German footballers
Association football fullbacks
FC St. Pauli II players
FC St. Pauli players
2. Bundesliga players
Regionalliga players